The Dactylosporaceae or Sclerococcaceae are a family of lichen-forming fungi in the class Eurotiomycetes. It is the only family of the order Sclerococcales and subclass Sclerococcomycetidae.

Taxonomy
There are currently seven genera in the family:
Cylindroconidiis  – 1 species
Fusichalara  – 5 species 
Gamsomyces  – 1 species
Longimultiseptata  – 2 species
Pseudobactrodesmium  – 3 species
Rhopalophora  – 1 species
Sclerococcum  (=Dactylospora , the type genus) – around 5080 species

References

Lecanorales
Lichen families
Lecanoromycetes families
Taxa described in 1982
Fungi described in 1982
Taxa named by Josef Hafellner